Civita di Bagnoregio is an outlying village of the comune of Bagnoregio in the Province of Viterbo in central Italy. The only access is a footbridge from the nearby town, with a toll introduced in 2013. Due to the toll, communal taxes were abolished in Civita and nearby Bagnoregio. Due to its unstable foundation that often erodes, Civita is famously known as "the dying city".

Territory 
Civita is situated in the valley of the badlands (Valle dei Calanchi), a region east of Lake Bolsena and west of the Tiber Valley, in the municipality of Bagnoregio. It consists of two main valleys: the Fossato del Rio Torbido and the Fossato del Rio Chiaro. Originally these places might have been easier to reach and were crossed by an ancient road that linked the Tiber Valley to Lake Bolsena.

The morphology of this region was caused by erosion and landslides. The territory is made up of two different formations of rocks, different in chronology and constitution. The most ancient formation is that of clay; it comes from the sea and forms the base layer which is particularly subject to erosion. The top layers are made up of tuff and lava material. The fast erosion is due to the streams, to atmospheric agents but also to deforestation.

Civita, which is inhabited by only 16 people, is situated in a solitary area and it is reachable only by a reinforced concrete pedestrian bridge built in 1995. The bridge is generally restricted to pedestrians, but to meet the requirements of residents and workers the Municipality of Bagnoregio stated that these people may cross the bridge by bike or by motorcycle at certain times. The reason for its isolation is the progressive erosion of the hill and the nearby valley which creates the badlands; this process is still ongoing and there is the danger that the village could disappear. This is why Civita is also known as "The Dying Town".

History 
Civita di Bagnoregio was founded by the Etruscans more than 2,500 years ago. Formerly there were five city gates to access the ancient town of Civita, nowadays instead, Porta Santa Maria (known as Porta Cava, as well) is the main gateway of the city. It is also possible to enter the town of Civita from the valley of the badlands through a tunnel carved into the rock.

The layout of the whole town is of Etruscan origin, based on a cardo and decumanus orthogonal street system according to the Etruscan and Roman use, while the entire architectural cladding is of medieval and Renaissance origin.

There are numerous traces of Etruscan civilisation in Civita, especially in the San Francesco Vecchio area: a little Etruscan necropolis was found in the cliff located in the area below Belvedere di San Francesco Vecchio. The cave of St Bonaventure (where it is said that Saint Francis healed the little Giovanni Fidanza, who later became Saint Bonaventure) is also an Etruscan chamber tomb.

The Etruscans made Civita (whose original name is unknown) a flourishing city, thanks to its strategic position favourable for trade and thanks to its proximity to the most important communication routes of the times.

Many traces of the Etruscan period are still suggestive spots: the so-called Bucaione, for example, is a deep tunnel that goes through the lowest part of the city and gives access to badlands valley directly from the town.

In the past, many chamber tombs were visible. They were dug at the base of Civita’s cliff and nearby tuff walls and, over the centuries, they were destroyed by several rockfalls. Indeed, the Etruscans themselves had to face problems of seismic activity and instability, like the earthquake of 280 B.C.

When the Romans arrived in 265 B.C., they took up and carried on the rainwater drainage and the stream containment works that were first started by the Etruscans.

Civita (or City) was the birthplace of Saint Bonaventure, who died in 1274. The location of his boyhood house has long since fallen off the edge of the cliff. By the 16th century, Civita di Bagnoregio was beginning to decline, becoming eclipsed by its former suburb Bagnoregio.

At the end of the 17th century, the bishop and the municipal government were forced to move to Bagnoregio because of a major earthquake that accelerated the old town's decline. At that time, the area was part of the Papal States. In the 19th century, Civita di Bagnoregio's location was turning into an island and the pace of the erosion quickened as the layer of clay below the stone reached the area where today's bridge is situated.

Bagnoregio continues as a small but prosperous town, while the older site became known in Italian as La città che muore ("The Dying Town"). Civita di Bagnoregio has only recently been experiencing a tourist revival.

CNN in January 2020 associated the "over-tourism" with the mayor deciding to charge a minor fee for entry, which increased publicity and subsequently attendance. CNN also noted that the town had more feline inhabitants than its 12 human residents.

The only access is a footbridge from the nearby town, with a €1.50 toll introduced in 2013 and increased in August 2017 to €3 on weekdays and €5 on Sundays and public holidays. Civita had 40,000 visitors in 2010 and was estimated to attract 850,000 visitors in 2017. Due to the toll, communal taxes were abolished in Civita and nearby Bagnoregio, making Bagnoregio the only town in Italy without communal taxes.

Location 

The town is noted for its striking position on top of a plateau of friable volcanic tuff overlooking the Tiber river valley. It is in constant danger of destruction as the edges of the plateau collapse due to erosion, leaving the buildings to crumble as their underlying support falls away. , there were plans to reinforce the plateau with steel rods to prevent further geological damage.

Architecture 
The city is also much admired for its architecture spanning several hundred years. Civita di Bagnoregio owes much of its unaltered condition to its relative isolation; the town was able to withstand most intrusions of modernity as well as the destruction brought by two world wars. The population today is 11 people, but due to a healthy amount of bed-and-breakfasts the village gets busy in the summer months.

The town was placed on the World Monuments Fund's 2006 Watch List of the 100 Most Endangered Sites, because of threats it faces from erosion and unregulated tourism.

Monuments and places of interest 
Inside the village there are several medieval houses; the church of San Donato, which overlooks the main square and inside which the holy wooden crucifix is kept; Alemanni Palace, home of the Geological and Landslides Museum; the Bishop’s Palace, a mill of the 16th century; the remains of the house where St. Bonaventure was born and the door of Santa Maria, with two lions holding a human head between their paws, in memory of a popular revolt of the inhabitants of Civita against the Orvieto family of Monaldeschi.

In 2005 there was a proposal for the gullies of Civita to become a site of community interest.

Economy and tourism 
The old village is part of the association I Borghi più belli d'Italia. Thanks to its evocative geographical position and its medieval buildings, the town attracts many tourists, and several times it has been used as a movie set.

In January 2021, the mayor of Bagnoregio submitted a proposal to UNESCO to designate Civita a World Heritage Site.

Culture

The Holy Crucifix of Civita 
On Good Friday, the Holy Crucifix is laid on a coffin in the church of San Donato to be transported in the secular "Processione del Venerdì Santo di Bagnoregio" ("Good Friday Procession of Bagnoregio"). The legend narrates that during a plague epidemic, which in 1449 hit the whole territory around Bagnoregio, the cross talked to a pious woman, who went every day before the venerated image asking with her prayers for the end of that agony. One day, while the woman was praying to Christ, she heard a voice that reassured her, saying that the Lord had fulfilled her prayers and that the pestilence would end. And indeed, after a few days, the plague was over, at the same time as the death of the pious woman.

Events

 At Christmas time a nativity scene takes place; the stories of Mary and Joseph are set in the medieval streets.
 The first Sunday of June and the second of September, in the main square, the secular Palio della Tonna (“tonda” in the local dialect) is prepared. In this palio (horse race) the districts of Civita challenge each other on donkey back, supported by cheering inhabitants.
 The first Sunday of June, there is the first feast day, called Maria SS. Liberatrice.
 The last week of July and the first of August the Tuscia in Jazz Festival takes place with concerts, seminars, and jam sessions.
 The second Sunday of September the second feast day takes place, called SS. Crocifisso.

Cinema and television

 Among the many movies shot in Civita: The Two Colonels (1962), directed by Stefano Vanzina; the episode Il prete of the movie Let’s Have a Riot (1970); the episode of the movie Nostalghia (1983) directed by Andrei Tarkovsky; the miniseries Pinocchio directed by Alberto Sironi transmitted on RAI 1 in 2009; Questione di Karma (2017), directed by Edoardo Falcone; My Big Gay Italian Wedding (2018) directed by Alessandro Genovesi.
 In Civita the initial footage of Esperança was shot, transmitted in Italy in 2002.
 Civita was Hayao Miyazaki's inspiration for Studio Ghibli's animated 1986 movie Castle in the Sky.

References

External links

 Information website (in Italian)
 Photographs of Bagnoregio
 The Northwest Institute for Architecture and Urban Studies in Italy
 The crumbling, picture-perfect Italian town that’s making a comeback, 7-minute report on the PBS NewsHour broadcast of October 27, 2015

Frazioni of the Province of Viterbo
Hilltowns in Lazio
Road-inaccessible communities of Europe
Volcanism of Italy